Rachel Starr (born November 26, 1983) is an American pornographic actress. She was inducted into the AVN Hall of Fame in 2022.

Early life
Rachel Starr was born in Burleson, Texas, United States and now lives in Dallas, Texas. She played tennis competitively while in high school, until she graduated early at the age of 16.

Career
Starr worked as a stripper prior to her porn career. She entered the adult film industry when Jack Venice, a male performer met her in December 2006 in Shreveport, Louisiana while at the Deja Vu Hustler Club. She made her on screen debut in the Naughty America movie American Daydreams, which was released on March 2, 2007. Starr signed a one year exclusive contract with Bangbros
on August 2, 2011. While working with Bangbros, Starr was also a brand ambassador for Naked.com until December 2017. On September 2, 2016, Starr signed an exclusive contract with Naughty America for two years,  where she did a series of virtual reality videos for the company. On August 1, 2020, Starr signed with Brazzers for one year; however, the contract was extended due to the various restrictions placed on production during the COVID-19 lockdown due to the pandemic. Shortly after, in November 2021, FanCentro signed Starr to be a brand ambassador to promote their platform.

Personal life
In 2013 Starr was linked romantically with baseball star Mike Napoli. That same year she was caught in a compromising position with Machine Gun Kelly, reportedly having given him oral sex while he was on stage.

In an interview with Power 98.3 FM radio in Phoenix, Arizona, Machine Gun Kelly stated that he and Starr made a sex tape, although it was never released to the public.

Starr has been friends with Tiger King star Joe Exotic since 2013. A mutual colleague of theirs asked Starr to do a photoshoot with Exotic in Wynnewood, Oklahoma. Rachel and Joe hit it off within the first 10 minutes of working together, and have remained close friends ever since. Starr and Joe Exotic worked together again in 2021 when from prison, Tiger King Joe Exotic released his first collection of NFTs in 2021.

Awards and nominations

See also

List of pornographic actors who appeared in mainstream films
List of pornographic performers by decade
List of members of the AVN Hall of Fame

References

External links

 
 
 
 
 
 

21st-century American actresses
American female adult models
American female erotic dancers
American erotic dancers
American pornographic film actresses
Living people
Actresses from Texas
People from Burleson, Texas
1983 births